The following is a list of FCC-licensed radio stations in the U.S. state of New York, which can be sorted by their call signs, frequencies, cities of license, licensees, and programming formats.

List of radio stations

Defunct
 W8XH
 WAIH
 WBVG
 WCBA
 WCEB
 WDCD
 WDT
 WETD
 WGYN
 WIRD
 WJY
 WMGM-FM
 WNYK
 WOSS
 WQKE
 WSPQ
 WVBN
 WXKW
 WYBG

References

Bibliography

External links 
 www.radiomap.us – List of radio stations in New York City
 www.radiomap.us – List of radio stations in Riverhead, New York (Long Island)
 www.radiomap.us – List of radio stations in Albany, New York
 www.radiomap.us – List of radio stations in Buffalo, New York

 
Radiostations
New York